Makoto Hiejima (born August 11, 1990) is a Japanese professional basketball player for Utsunomiya Brex of the Japanese B.League.

Professional career
A Fukuoka Prefecture native and Rakunan High School alum, Hiejima attended Aoyama Gakuin University before making his pro debut with the Aisin SeaHorses Mikawa in 2013. He played a pivotal role in helping the rebranded SeaHorses Mikawa win the B.League West Division (46–14) in 2016–17 in the circuit's inaugural campaign and finish first in the Central Division (48–12) in 2017–18, when he was named league MVP behind averages of 12.9 points, 4.1 assists and 2.9 rebounds in 55 games.

In July 2018, Hiejima signed a five-year deal with Link Tochigi Brex. As part of his deal with the Brex, he was free to pursue higher-level opportunities elsewhere and return to Tochigi at any time. The following month, he signed with the Brisbane Bullets of the Australian NBL under the league's Asian Player rule. On January 5, 2019, he was released by the Bullets. Four days later, he joined Link Tochigi Brex for the rest of the season.

National team career
In 2013, Hiejima made his international debut for Japan at the FIBA Asia Championship. In 2014, he helped Japan win bronze at the Asian Games.

Career statistics 

|-
| align="left" | 2013–14
| align="left" | Aisin
| 53 || 5 || 30.4 || .501 || .462 || .762 || 3.1 || 2.9 || 1.1 || .3 || 11.8
|-
| align="left"  style="background-color:#afe6ba; border: 1px solid gray" |2014–15†
| align="left" | Aisin
| 42 || 36 || 29.3 || .466 || .294 || .738 || 2.9 || 3.0 || 1.3 || .3 || 10.2
|-
| align="left" | 2015–16
| align="left" | Aisin
| 51 || 51 || 32.6 || .493 || .369 || .771 || 3.2 || 2.9 || 1.3 || .4 || 14.3
|-
| align="left" | 2016–17
| align="left" | Mikawa
| 59 || 55 || 29.1 || .474 || .420 || .769 || 3.1 || 3.4 || 1.2 || .4 || 12.9
|-
| align="left" | 2017–18
| align="left" | Mikawa
| 55 || 44 || 25.9 || .505 || .395 || .760 || 2.9 || 4.1 || 1.2 || .5 || 12.9
|-
| align="left" | 2018–19
| align="left" | Brisbane
| 3 || 0 || .6 || .000 || .000 || .000 || .0 || .0 || .0 || .0 || .0
|-
|}

References

External links
 Makoto Hiejima at fiba.basketball
 Stats in Japan

1990 births
Living people
Asian Games bronze medalists for Japan
Asian Games medalists in basketball
Basketball players at the 2014 Asian Games
Basketball players at the 2020 Summer Olympics
Brisbane Bullets players
Expatriate basketball people in Australia
Japanese expatriate basketball people
Japanese expatriate sportspeople in Australia
Japanese men's basketball players
Olympic basketball players of Japan
Utsunomiya Brex players
Medalists at the 2014 Asian Games
SeaHorses Mikawa players
Shooting guards
Sportspeople from Fukuoka (city)
2019 FIBA Basketball World Cup players